Galen Luther Stone (November 21, 1862 – December 26, 1926) was an American financier and philanthropist.

Biography 
Stone was born in Leominster, Massachusetts. In his teens, he worked as an office clerk in Boston, Massachusetts. He became financial editor of the Boston Advertiser in his 20s. Together with Charles Hayden, he founded the stock brokerage firms of Hayden, Stone & Co. and Haystone Securities Corporation of Boston and New York City. In 1919, his firm hired fellow Bostonian Joseph P. Kennedy.

In 1889, he married Carrie Morton Gregg (1866–1945) of Boston and the couple eventually made their home in Brookline, Massachusetts. An avid yachtsman, in his later years, Stone owned the  yacht Arcadia.

Stone held financial interests in numerous companies and was president of the Atlantic Gulf and West Indies Steamship Company, and in 1900 he and his associates formed the Eastern Steamship Lines He was chairman of the Pond Creek Coal Company and the Pike County, Kentucky, mining town of Stone was named in his honor.

Stone used his fortune for a number of charitable causes, many of which centered on the arts and education. In 1915, through the fundraising efforts of the educator Charlotte Hawkins Brown, he became aware of Palmer Memorial Institute, an African-American preparatory school in Sedalia, North Carolina. Stone became the institute's largest benefactor. As well, his philanthropic work was recognized with the creation of the Galen Stone Professor of International Trade chair at the Harvard University Institute for International Development. A trustee of Wellesley College from 1915 to 1925, he donated the funds to build the Galen Stone Tower at Green Hall. He was once vice-president of the trustees of the Boston Symphony Orchestra.

Stone was honored for his philanthropy by initiation as an honorary member of Phi Mu Alpha Sinfonia fraternity in 1917 at the New England Conservatory of Music in Boston. The fraternity's mission reflects Stone's values by developing young men to share their talents to create harmony in the world.

Galen Stone died of heart failure at his home in Brookline in 1926.

A World War II Liberty ship, SS Galen L. Stone, was named in Stone's honor.

Stone's grandson, also Galen Luther Stone, served as United States Ambassador to Cyprus.

References 

1862 births
1926 deaths
American financiers
American investors
American philanthropists
Businesspeople from Massachusetts
People from Brookline, Massachusetts
People from Leominster, Massachusetts
Stock and commodity market managers